Tolypocladium ophioglossoides, also known by two of its better known synonyms Elaphocordyceps ophioglossoides and Cordyceps ophioglossoides and commonly known as the goldenthread cordyceps, is a species of fungus in the family Ophiocordycipitaceae. It is parasitic on fruit bodies of the truffle-like Elaphomyces. The specific epithet ophioglossoides, derived from Ancient Greek, means "like a snake's tongue". The species is inedible.

References

External links

Fungi described in 1787
Fungi of North America
Inedible fungi
Ophiocordycipitaceae
Taxa named by Jakob Friedrich Ehrhart